Deo is a village in the Bamingui-Bangoran Prefecture in the northern Central African Republic.

Populated places in Bamingui-Bangoran
N'Délé